The Ministry of Expatriates' Welfare and Overseas Employment is a ministry of the government of the People's Republic of Bangladesh. It provided information, partnerships and facilitations for all matters related to overseas Bangladeshis and overseas employment.

Departments
Bureau of Manpower, Employment and Training
Wage Earners' Welfare Board (WEWB)
Bangladesh Overseas Employment and Services Limited (BOESL)
Probashi Kallyan Bank

References

 
Expatriates' Welfare and Overseas Employment
Diaspora ministries
Bangladeshi diaspora